Sergei Afanasyevich Kolosov (born May 22, 1986) is a Belarusian former ice hockey defenceman. He last played with Generals Kiev of the Ukrainian Hockey League. Kolosov was drafted by the Detroit Red Wings of the National Hockey League (NHL) in 2004, and signed a contract with the team on June 25, 2008.

He played for the Belarusian national team at the 2008, 2010, and 2011 World Championships, as well as the 2010 Winter Olympics.

Career statistics

Regular season and playoffs

International

References

External links

1986 births
Belarusian ice hockey defencemen
Detroit Red Wings draft picks
Grand Rapids Griffins players
Ice hockey players at the 2010 Winter Olympics
MKS Cracovia (ice hockey) players
Living people
Olympic ice hockey players of Belarus
Orlik Opole players
People from Navapolatsk
Sportspeople from Vitebsk Region